Nida Khuhro is a Pakistani politician who has been a member of the Provincial Assembly of Sindh since August 2018.

Political career

She was elected to the Provincial Assembly of Sindh as a candidate of Pakistan Peoples Party (PPP) on reserved seat for women (RSW-136) in 2018 Sindh Provincial Elections.

She is a member of the following standing committees in the Provincial Assembly of Sindh:

 Standing Committee on Finance.
 Standing Committee on Food.
 Standing Committee on Higher Education, Technical Education and Research, School Education (upto Matriculation) and Special Education.
 Standing Committee on Services, General Administration and Coordination Department (Services, GA, I&C & IPC Wings).

References

Living people
Pakistan People's Party MPAs (Sindh)
Year of birth missing (living people)